De Steeg is a Dutch village within the municipality of Rheden. Due to its central location within the municipality, it houses the town hall.

Middachten Castle is located near the village. Several De Steeg buildings once belonged to the Middachten estate. These buildings, including the Post office in De Steeg, can be recognized by the red and white color scheme.

History 
It was first mentioned in 1648 as Opde Steegh, and means path. The village developed around Middachten Castle. The castle was first mentioned in 1315. The current building dates from between 1354 and 1357. It was restored in 1643, and enlarged between 1694 and 1697. Rhederoord is a manor house from the 17th century which was enlarged in 1745. In 1840, De Steeg was home to 545 people. In 1885, it became an independent parish.

Gallery

References 

Populated places in Gelderland
Rheden